Kim Ki-taik (Hangul: 김기택, Hanja: 金琦澤; born October 3, 1962) is a former table tennis player from South Korea who competed in the 1988 Summer Olympics. In 1988 he won the silver medal in the men's singles.

See also
 List of table tennis players

References

External links
Sports-reference.com Profile

1962 births
Living people
South Korean male table tennis players
Table tennis players at the 1988 Summer Olympics
Olympic table tennis players of South Korea
Olympic silver medalists for South Korea
Olympic medalists in table tennis
Asian Games medalists in table tennis
Table tennis players at the 1982 Asian Games
Medalists at the 1982 Asian Games
Asian Games silver medalists for South Korea
Asian Games bronze medalists for South Korea
Medalists at the 1988 Summer Olympics